Dilipa fenestra is a  butterfly found in the East  Palearctic (East China, Northeast China, Korea) that belongs to the browns family.

Description from Seitz

D. fenestra Leech ( = Apatura chrysus Oberth.) (51c) is a singular species, red-brown being its prevailing ground-colour. In the male the forewing dusted witli blackish in the basal area, there being further a broad black oblique band from the costal margin to the second median branch, behind the band a round spot as in the female, at the hinder angle an elongate spot, anteriorly 2 transparent subapical spots; the distal margin edged with black. Hindwing also margined with black distally, with a median band composed of 6 black spots, the basal and hindmarginal areas grey dusted with black. Underside as in female, ground-colour of the forewing more yellow. West China: Omei-shan, Lufang; in July, very rare. — The second, but essentially different, known species of this genus, D. morgiana Westw., inhabits the mountains of North India and touches the Palaearctic territory  only in the North-West (Kashmir). — Nothing is known of the habits.

See also
List of butterflies of Russia

References

Apaturinae
Butterflies described in 1891